The 2002 Atlanta Braves season marked the franchise's 37th season in Atlanta and 132nd overall. The Braves won their 8th consecutive division title, finishing 19 games ahead of the second-place Montreal Expos. The Braves lost the 2002 Divisional Series to the eventual NL Champion San Francisco Giants, 3 games to 2. This would be the first of four consecutive NLDS losses in as many years, and the first of three consecutive years to do so by losing the deciding Game 5 at Turner Field.

2002 marked the final year that pitchers Tom Glavine, Greg Maddux and John Smoltz played on the same team ending the reign of what has been considered by many the greatest pitching trio of all-time. All three would be inducted into the Baseball Hall of Fame a decade later. Smoltz set the Braves' single season record for saves (55). Chipper Jones moved to the outfield in left field to allow for Vinny Castilla to be signed and added to the lineup at third base. Julio Franco became a regular player in the second stint of his Major League career and Gary Sheffield was acquired to the Braves in 2002, playing at right field.

Offseason
October 26, 2001: Aaron Small was signed as a free agent with the Atlanta Braves.
December 4, 2001: John Smoltz was re-signed from free agency back to the Atlanta Braves.
December 11, 2001: Vinny Castilla signed as a free agent with the Atlanta Braves. 
December 17, 2001: Julio Franco was re-signed from free agency back to the Atlanta Braves.
January 15, 2002: Gary Sheffield was traded by the Los Angeles Dodgers to the Atlanta Braves for Andrew Brown, Brian Jordan and Odalis Pérez.
January 16, 2002: Doug Linton was signed as a free agent with the Atlanta Braves.
March 20, 2002: Henry Blanco was traded by the Milwaukee Brewers to the Atlanta Braves for Paul Bako and Jose Cabrera.

Regular season

Opening Day starters
Vinny Castilla
Rafael Furcal
Marcus Giles
Tom Glavine
Andruw Jones
Chipper Jones
Javy Lopez
Gary Sheffield
B. J. Surhoff

Season standings

National League East

Record vs. opponents

Transactions
 June 4, 2002: Jeff Francoeur was drafted by the Atlanta Braves in the 1st round (23rd pick) of the 2002 amateur draft. Player signed July 8, 2002.
September 30, 2002: Aaron Small was released by the Atlanta Braves.

Roster

Player stats

Batting

Starters by position
Note: Pos = Position; G = Games played; AB = At bats; H = Hits; Avg. = Batting average; HR = Home runs; RBI = Runs batted in

Other batters
Note: G = Games played; AB = At bats; H = Hits; Avg. = Batting average; HR = Home runs; RBI = Runs batted in

Pitching

Starting pitchers
Note: G = Games pitched; IP = Innings pitched; W = Wins; L = Losses; ERA = Earned run average; SO = Strikeouts

Other pitchers
Note: G = Games pitched; IP = Innings pitched; W = Wins; L = Losses; ERA = Earned run average; SO = Strikeouts

Relief pitchers
Note: G = Games pitched; W = Wins; L = Losses; SV = Saves; ERA = Earned run average; SO = Strikeouts

2002 National League Division Series

San Francisco Giants vs. Atlanta Braves
San Francisco (eventual NL Champion) wins the series, 3-2

Award winners

2002 Major League Baseball season
Braves' team pitching led the league with a 3.13 ERA. John Smoltz was National League Relief Man of the Year, as he led the league with 55 saves, which was a National League record at the time (since broken by Éric Gagné in 2003). Greg Maddux and Andruw Jones were chosen for Gold Glove awards.

2002 Major League Baseball All-Star Game
Representing the Braves on the 2002 National League All-Star team were pitchers Tom Glavine, Mike Remlinger and John Smoltz. Andruw Jones was elected to receive the final roster spot on the 2002 National League All-Star team.

Farm system

References

 2002 Atlanta Braves at Baseball Reference

National League East champion seasons
Atlanta Braves seasons
Atlanta Braves Season, 2002
Atlanta Braves Season, 2002
Atlanta Braves